Repertoire Records is a German record label from Hamburg, Germany, specialising in reissues of classic pop and rock albums originally issued in the 1960s and 1970s. The chairman is Thomas Neelsen.

See also 
 List of record labels

References

External links
 Official site

German record labels
Pop record labels
Rock record labels
Reissue record labels
Culture in Hamburg
Companies based in Hamburg
IFPI members
 Repertoire Records